The white-throated oxylabes (Oxylabes madagascariensis) is a species of passerine bird. Formerly considered part of the Old World warbler family Sylviidae, it has been moved to the family Bernieridae — the Malagasy warblers. It is endemic to Madagascar, where its natural habitat is subtropical or tropical moist lowland forests.

In 2013, genetic studies determined that the former Bluntschli's vanga (also known as short-toed nuthatch-vanga), a species described in 1996 from two specimens collected in 1931, was actually this species. The specimens were both juveniles in a poorly known brown plumage.

References

Malagasy warblers
white-throated oxylabes
white-throated oxylabes
Taxonomy articles created by Polbot